The Church of Jesus Christ of Latter-day Saints in Delaware refers to the Church of Jesus Christ of Latter-day Saints (LDS Church) and its members in Delaware.  As of 2021, the LDS Church reported 	5,595 members in 12 congregations.

Official church membership as a percentage of general population was 0.55% in 2014. According to the 2014 Pew Forum on Religion & Public Life survey, less than 1% of Delawareans self-identify themselves most closely with the LDS Church. The LDS Church is the 11th largest denomination in Delaware.

History

Missionaries for LDS Church arrived in Delaware in 1837.

Block teaching began in 1941 among some 16 LDS families meetings began May 4, and the Wilmington branch was organized September 28, 1941.  The branch, with 9 adults and 10 children, continued with little growth for the next decade.  In 1950, some 63 attended a branch party at the home of the branch president.  The Salisbury Branch was organized in 1953.  The Dover Branch was organized later that decade.

In 2010, Delaware member Bruce Winn, CEO of 1,100 employees at the Corporation Service Co., left the company to serve as a mission president and, later, as the first temple president of the Philadelphia Pennsylvania Temple.

Stakes
In 1960, the Philadelphia Stake was created which included Delaware congregations. Prior to that, the congregations were part of the Washington Stake. On December 8, 1974, the Wilmington Delaware Stake was created covering the Delaware and nearby areas in Maryland, New Jersey, and Pennsylvania. On November 18, 1979, the New Jersey Wards and branches of the Wilmington Stake were organized as the Pitman New Jersey Stake (reorganized as the Cherry Hill New Jersey Stake on September 23, 1986).

On June 18, 2006, William W. John, programs manager at DuPont, became stake president for the Wilmington Delaware Stake.

On April 12, 2012, The Dover Delaware stake (Delaware's second) was created from the Wilmington Delaware Stake.

As of February 2023, Delaware had the following congregations:

Dover Delaware Stake
Camden Ward
Dover Ward
Harrington Ward
Salisbury Ward (Maryland)
Seaford Ward
Smyrna Ward

Wilmington Delaware Stake
Bayview Ward (Maryland)
Newark 1st Ward
Newark 2nd Ward
Newark 3rd Ward
Wilmington 1st Ward
Wilmington 2nd Ward
Wilmington 3rd Branch (Spanish)
Newark YSA Branch

Missions
Delaware is part of the Pennsylvania Philadelphia Mission.

Temples
Delaware is part of the Philadelphia Pennsylvania Temple District.

See also

The Church of Jesus Christ of Latter-day Saints membership statistics (United States)

References

External links
 Newsroom (Delaware)
 ComeUntoChrist.org Latter-day Saints Visitor site
 The Church of Jesus Christ of Latter-day Saints Official site
 Deseret News 2010 Church Almanac

Latter Day Saint movement in Delaware
Delaware